Ben Gilliland (born 30 January 1976) is an author, science writer and graphic journalist. Originally from Darlington in County Durham, he now lives and works in Royal Tunbridge Wells, Kent.

Professional life and awards 
From 1999 until 2010 Gilliland worked at the Metro Newspaper in London, initially as the graphics editor. In 2005 he was appointed as editor of MetroCosm, the paper's popular graphics-based science feature created by Gilliland.

After leaving the Metro in 2010, Gilliland pursued a career as a freelance science writer and educator while continuing to create the Cosm series and publish them via CosmOnline.

In April 2015 he was appointed as editor of Astronomy Now magazine, a post first occupied by Patrick Moore, to succeed Keith Cooper from September 2015.

In 2013 Gilliland was awarded the Sir Arthur Clarke Award (popularly known as an "Arthur") for Space Achievement in Media. The award was presented at the UK Space Conference at the Glasgow Science Centre by Tim Peake the UK's first ESA astronaut.

Publications
 100 People Who Made History: Meet the People Who Shaped the Modern World, 2012
 Science But Not As We Know It, 2015
 How to Build a Universe: From the Big Bang to the End of the Universe, 2015

References 

Living people
1976 births
British writers
People from East Preston, West Sussex
People from Darlington